Michael West (born 9 February 1991) is an English footballer who plays as a midfielder for Herne Bay.

Career
He started his career as a trainee with Fulham before joining the Ebbsfleet United PASE youth system. He went on to sign his first professional contract with the club in January 2009, making his debut in a 1–0 win over Northwich Victoria in the Football Conference. A series of impressive performances, including scoring a brace in a 2–2 draw against Luton Town, drawing the attention of many league clubs, with Fulham, Stevenage and Portsmouth all rumoured to have been interested in acquiring his services. In July 2012, he joined newly promoted Football League One side Crewe Alexandra for a nominal compensation fee. He made his professional debut for Crewe on 20 October 2012, in a 2–2 draw with Walsall, coming on as a substitute for Max Clayton.

On 26 August 2013 he joined Conference National side Hereford United on loan for a month, making his debut on the same day in a 2–1 defeat to Alfreton Town. He rejoined Ebbsfleet in January 2014. A serious injury early in his second spell at Ebbsfleet meant that he didn't play for a year. He made his comeback from injury as a substitute in a 3–0 win over Whitehawk, scoring the third goal. Injuries continued to hamper his progress, although West did get the fourth goal in a 4–1 FA Trophy win against Molesey.

West played the second half of the 2015–2016 season on loan at Whitehawk, before signing permanently in July 2016 following his release from Stonebridge Road.

In June 2017, West signed for Chelmsford City.

On 27 June 2018, West signed for Eastbourne Borough.

On 17 July 2020, West returned to Ebbsfleet United.

On 18 March 2022, West joined Isthmian League South East Division side Herne Bay on loan until 23 April 2022. In June 2022, West returned to the club on a permanent basis having helped the club to promotion through the play-offs.

Career statistics

References

External links

1991 births
Living people
English footballers
Association football midfielders
Ebbsfleet United F.C. players
Crewe Alexandra F.C. players
Hereford United F.C. players
Whitehawk F.C. players
Chelmsford City F.C. players
Kingstonian F.C. players
Eastbourne Borough F.C. players
Tonbridge Angels F.C. players
Herne Bay F.C. players
English Football League players
National League (English football) players
Isthmian League players